The first season of the American animated television series The Simpsons originally aired on the Fox network between December 17, 1989, and May 13, 1990, beginning with the Christmas special "Simpsons Roasting on an Open Fire." The executive producers for the first production season were Matt Groening, James L. Brooks, and Sam Simon.

The series was originally set to debut in fall 1989 with the episode "Some Enchanted Evening", (which was meant to introduce the main characters), but during the first screening of the episode, the producers discovered that the animation was so poor that 70% of the episode needed to be redone.

The producers considered aborting the series if the next episode turned out as bad, but it suffered from only easily fixable problems. The producers convinced Fox to move the debut to December 17, and aired "Simpsons Roasting on an Open Fire" as the first episode of the series. The first season won one Emmy Award, and received four additional nominations. The DVD boxset was released on September 25, 2001, in Region 1 and September 24, 2001, in both Region 2 and Region 4.

With a total of 13 episodes, this is the shortest season of the show to date.

Voice cast & characters

Main cast
 Dan Castellaneta as Homer Simpson, Barney Gumble, additional voices
 Grampa Simpson in "Simpsons Roasting on an Open Fire", "Bart the General" & "The Telltale Head"
 Krusty The Clown in "The Telltale Head" & "Krusty Gets Busted"
 Julie Kavner as Marge Simpson, additional voices
 Patty and Selma in "Simpsons Roasting on an Open Fire", "Life on the Fast Lane"
 Nancy Cartwright as Bart Simpson, Lewis, additional voices
 Nelson Muntz in "Bart The General"
 Ralph Wiggum in "Simpsons Roasting on an Open Fire"
 Yeardley Smith as Lisa Simpson, additional voices
 Harry Shearer as additional voices
 Waylon Smithers in "Simpsons Roasting on an Open Fire", "Homer's Odyssey", "There's No Disgrace Like Home", "The Telltale Head" & "Homer's Night Out"
 Principal Skinner in "Simpsons Roasting on an Open Fire", "Bart the Genius", "The Telltale Head" & "The Crepes of Wrath"
 Reverend Lovejoy in "The Telltale Head", "Homer's Night Out", "Krusty Gets Busted"
 Mr. Burns in "There's No Disgrace Like Home" & "Homer's Night Out" 
 Mr. Burns was voiced by Christopher Collins in all other appearances ("Simpsons Roasting on an Open Fire", "Homer's Odyssey" & "The Telltale Head")
 Lenny Leonard in "Life on the Fast Lane", "Homer's Night Out" and "The Crepes of Wrath"
 Ned Flanders in "Simpsons Roasting on an Open Fire" & "The Call of the Simpsons"
 Kent Brockman in "Krusty Gets Busted"

Recurring
 Hank Azaria as Chief Wiggum, Moe Szyslak, Carl Carlson, and Apu
 Pamela Hayden as Milhouse Van Houten
 Tress MacNeille as Jimbo Jones and Agnes Skinner
 Russi Taylor as Martin Prince and Sherri and Terri
 Marcia Wallace as Edna Krabappel
 Jo Ann Harris as background characters
 Maggie Roswell as Helen Lovejoy and Princess Kashmir
 Sam McMurray as Worker Drone
 Christopher Collins as Mr. Burns  (episodes 1, 4 and 8), Moe Szyslak (episode 13) and TV host
 Albert Brooks as Cowboy Bob and Jacques

Guest stars

 Ron Taylor as Bleeding Gums Murphy  ("Moaning Lisa")
 Susan Blu as Howie and Boy #2  ("Moaning Lisa") 
 Miriam Flynn as Miss Barr ("Moaning Lisa")
 Christian Coffinet as Gendarme Officer  ("The Crepes of Wrath")
 Kelsey Grammer as Sideshow Bob ("Krusty Gets Busted")
 Penny Marshall as Ms. Botz  ("Some Enchanted Evening")
 June Foray as a receptionist  ("Some Enchanted Evening")
 Paul Willson as a florist  ("Some Enchanted Evening")

Reception

Ratings

The Simpsons first season was Fox network's first TV series to rank among a season's top 30 highest-rated shows. It won an Emmy and received four additional nominations. Although television shows are limited to one episode per category, "Simpsons Roasting on an Open Fire" was considered a separate special and nominated alongside fellow episode "Life on the Fast Lane" for Outstanding Animated Program; "Life on the Fast Lane" won. "Simpsons Roasting on an Open Fire" was also nominated for "Outstanding Editing in a Miniseries or Special", while "The Call of the Simpsons" was nominated for "Outstanding Individual Achievement in Sound Mixing for a Comedy Series or a Special". The main theme song, composed by Danny Elfman, was nominated for "Outstanding Achievement in Main Title Theme Music".

Critical and public response
The first season of The Simpsons received positive reviews. On Rotten Tomatoes, the season has a 100% approval rating based on 18 critical reviews with an average rating of 8.5/10. The site's critical consensus reads: "The Simpsons''' first season proves a quickly addictive introduction to America's animated first family with a run of entertaining episodes that set the stage for a groundbreaking series." On Metacritic, a site which uses a weighted mean score, the season scored a 79/100 from six critics, translating to "generally favorable reviews". However, the show was controversial from its beginning. The rebellious lead character at the time, Bart, frequently received no punishment for his misbehavior, which led some parents to characterize him as a poor role model for children. Several US public schools even banned The Simpsons merchandise and t-shirts, such as one featuring Bart and the caption "Underachiever ('And proud of it, man!')". Despite the ban, The Simpsons merchandise sold well and generated US$2 billion in revenue during the first 14 months of sales.

At the 6th annual Television Critics Association Awards, the first season of the show won 'Outstanding Achievement in Comedy', beating the likes of "Designing Women," "Murphy Brown," "Newhart," and "The Wonder Years." Additionally, it was nominated for 'Program of the Year' but lost to "Twin Peaks."

Episodes

Home media
The DVD boxset for season one was released by 20th Century Fox Home Entertainment in the United States and Canada on September 25, 2001, eleven years after it had completed broadcast on television. As well as every episode from the season, the DVD release features bonus material including deleted scenes, animatics, and commentaries for every episode. The commentaries were recorded in late 2000. When the first season DVD was released in 2001, it quickly became the best-selling television DVD in history. It was later overtaken by the 2004 release of Chappelle's Show'' Season 1. As of October 19, 2004, the DVD boxset sold 1.9 million units.

See also

 List of The Simpsons episodes
 The Simpsons shorts

References

Bibliography

External links

 Season 1 at The Simpsons.com
 Season 1 at the BBC

1989 American television seasons
1990 American television seasons
simpsons season 1